Dantkal is a village near Sirsi, Siddapura Taluk, North Kanara, State of Karnataka, India. All people staying there are Havyaka Brahmins, and the village is only connected with roads from Sirsi and Siddapur. This place is famous for "Kemmannu" So this place is known as Kemmannu Dantkal. The place is on the shore of river "Aghanashini". "Agha" means "sin" and "Nashini" means "remover". Dantkal is mainly famous for Ananta Bhattana Appe. This is a different type of mango.
Locations
Dantkal is near Balur and 1.5 km from Balur and its 9 km from Kansur. Every side full of forest. one side is in AGHANASHINI Rivar. Most of the peoples are Areconout grovers. Some of the younger generations peoples are in Bangalore, Sirsi, USA, Hyderabad etc. Dantkal from sirsi 22 km from siddapura 33 km.

Notable Areas
Kemmannu Gudda
Kote Gudda
Theppe sawalu Kallu
Saragallu hole 
Balepatte Chowka 
Ananth Bhattana Appe

Villages in Uttara Kannada district